Lock and Dam No. 13 is a lock and dam located on the Upper Mississippi River above Fulton, Illinois and Clinton, Iowa, United States. This facility offers visitors a view of the barges and boats locking through on the widest pool in the Upper Mississippi River.

The non-movable portion of the dam continues toward the Iowa shore with a  storage yard, a  non-submersible dike, a  submersible dike, and a  non-submersible dike with two  transitional sections between the submersible and non-submersible sections. There is also an  non-submersible dike on the Illinois side east of the locks. In 2004, the facility was listed in the National Register of Historic Places as Lock and Dam No. 13 Historic District, #04000173 covering  , 1 building, 6 structures, and 4 objects.

This lock and dam represent the man-made exit from the Driftless Area, where  shipping has to travel a few feet above bedrock over the  shipping channel.

See also
 Public Works Administration dams list
 Upper Mississippi River National Wildlife and Fish Refuge

References

External links

Lock and Dam No. 13 - U.S. Army Corps of Engineers

Transportation buildings and structures in Clinton County, Iowa
Buildings and structures in Whiteside County, Illinois
Buildings and structures in Clinton, Iowa
Dams completed in 1939
Dams in Illinois
Dams in Iowa
13
13
Driftless Area
Historic American Engineering Record in Illinois
Historic American Engineering Record in Iowa
Historic districts on the National Register of Historic Places in Illinois
13
Mississippi River locks
Moderne architecture in Illinois
Moderne architecture in Iowa
National Register of Historic Places in Whiteside County, Illinois
Roller dams
Gravity dams
Dams on the Mississippi River
Mississippi Valley Division
13